Masz To Jak W Banku is the debut album of O.S.T.R., a Polish rapper.

Track listing
"Intro"
"O+"
"Kiedy" (When)
"Kakafonia"
"A.B.C."
"Ja To P!" (I F it!)
"Świata Kwietnik" (World's Flower-Bed)
"Masz To Jak W Banku"
"Z..." (From...)
"Yebać" (To Phuck)
"Widzisz Błąd" (You See the Mistake)
"Dzień Po Dniu" (Day After Day)
"1001 Karier" (1001 Careers)
"Płonie (Skit)" (Burns)
"Profesja" (Profession)
"Salsa"
"P.E.C.H." (B.A.D.L.U.C.K.)
"Ile Jestem W Stanie Dać" (How much I'm willing to give)
"Nie Ma Tego Złego" (It's an Ill Wind; lit. first part of saying: There Is No Bad Thing [Which Wouldn't Become a Good One])
"Hał (Skit)"
"O.S.T.R."

External links 
Asfalt Records

O.S.T.R. albums
2001 debut albums
Polish-language albums